Revelations in Black is a collection of fantasy and horror short stories by American writer  Carl Jacobi. It was released in 1947 and was the author's first book.  It was published  by Arkham House with an edition of 3,082 copies.

Most of the stories were published originally in the magazines Weird Tales and Startling Stories.

Contents

Revelations in Black features the following tales:

 "Revelations in Black"
 "Phantom Brass"
 "The Cane"
 "The Coach on the Ring"
 "The Kite"
 "Canal"
 "The Satanic Piano"
 "The Last Drive"
 "The Spectral Pistol"
 "Sagasta's Last"
 "The Tomb from Beyond"
 "The Digging at Pistol Key"
 "Moss Island"
 "Carnaby's Fish"
 "The King and the Knave"
 "Cosmic Teletype"
 "A Pair of Swords"
 "A Study in Darkness"
 "Mive"
 "Writing on the Wall"
 "The Face in the Wind"

Sources

1947 short story collections
Horror short story collections
Fantasy short story collections
Science fiction short story collections by Carl Jacobi
Pulp stories
Arkham House books